"Sunlight" is a song performed by Swiss house and electro DJ and record producer DJ Antoine featuring vocals from Belgian singer-songwriter Tom Dice. It was released on 27 May 2011. It peaked at number 10 on the Swiss Singles Chart.

Music video
A music video to accompany the release of "Sunlight" was first released onto YouTube on 16 September 2011 at a total length of three minutes and fifty-two seconds.

Track listing

Chart performance

Weekly charts

Year-end charts

Certifications

Release history

References

2011 singles
2011 songs